Stanislav Mihaylovich Sokolov (born May 18, 1947) is a Russian stop-motion animation director. He graduated from VGIK in 1971 and has since then worked with Studios Soyuzmultfilm, DEFA, Christmasfilms and S4C. He was awarded a number of prizes for his films, most notably an Emmy in 1992 for his contribution to The Animated Shakespeare series. Sokolov is teaching at VGIK, where he is Professor for Animation and Computer Graphics.

Filmography
The Guess (1977)
About Ruff Ruffovich (1979)
Der Soldat und der Garten (1980)
The Homeless Hobgoblings (1981)
The Fish Carriage (1982)
Black and White Cinema (1984)
Falling Shadow (1985)
The Great Underground Ball (1987)
The Gold Sword, (Zolotaya shpaga, 1990)
And what's under the mask? (1991)
Shakespeare: the Animated Tales — The Tempest (1992)
Shakespeare: the Animated Tales — The Winter's Tale (1994)
The Miracle Maker (2000)
Our Father (Christian prayer) (2000)
Alfatitah (Muslim prayer) (2001)
Shema Israel (Jewish prayer) (2003)
Hoffmaniada (Soyuzmultfilm, being backed by Mikhail Shemyakin) (2018)

External links
The Russian Animation Database's entry on Stanislav Sokolov at the Animator.ru
The New York Times' entry on the Miracle Maker

A couple of Gofmaniada links (all in Russian): 
News article with picture of Shemyakin next to a puppet from the film 
Video news story on the upcoming film
Another news article
The film's entry at Kinoros

1947 births
Living people
Russian animators
Russian animated film directors
Russian artists
Stop motion animators
Soviet animators
Animation educators
Soviet animation directors